The Aquidabán River (Spanish: Río Aquidabán) is a river in the Amambay Department, in northeastern Paraguay.  It is a tributary of the larger Paraguay River.   Its headwaters start in the Amambai Mountains, and the river flows east-to-west to eventually merge into the Paraguay River just north of Concepción.

See also
List of rivers of Paraguay

References
Rand McNally, The New International Atlas, 1993.
 GEOnet Names Server

Rivers of Paraguay